Hermann Ambrosius (25 July 1897 – 25 October 1983) was a German composer and music educator.

Life 
Born in Hamburg, Ambrosius came via Magdeburg, Berlin and Chemnitz to Leipzig, where he received his musical education. He was a master student of Hans Pfitzner at the Prussian Academy of Arts.

After the Machtergreifung by the Nazis, Ambrosius became a member of the NSDAP on 4 March 1933 under the party number 2,994,125. Since 1936 he was also active as Gauobmann Mitte of the Reichsmusikkammer. From 1943 to 1945 he was a teacher at the "Städtische Musikschule für Jugend und Volk" in Leipzig. After he had been drafted into the Wehrmacht for the first time in 1939, he was exempted from military service in 1940, but had to do military service again in 1944 until the end of the Second World War. During the National Socialism period he wrote various cantatas and songs for male choir in conformity with the system in addition to symphonic and concertante music and the Deutschen Landschaftsbildern (1939).

From 1945 Ambrosius worked as a private music teacher, choir leader and freelance artist. After his death, the city of Engen honoured the composer and named a street after him.

Ambrosius left an extensive compositional legacy of over 500 works. They had already been the focus of attention of soloists and chamber music ensembles since the 1930s and have enjoyed ever increasing popularity ever since. The "" expressly promoted his work for this field and made him an honorary member.

Ambrosius died in Enden at the age of 86.

Work 
 Symphonies No. 1-12
 3 piano concertos
 Duo for flute and accordion
 Eggersberger Trio for 3 guitars
 Danza ritmica, 1957
 German Minnesongs and Duets with Orchestra, 1952
 Off hours, four little pieces, 1939
 Party music for string quartet
 Three fugues for wind quintet
 Jesus' suffering and death, 1927
 Balder's death on texts by Edda, op. 61
 Cantata for solos, choir and orchestra, 1953
 Small concert in old style for two guitars, published  , 1953
 Concerto in D minor for soprano, alto, bass recorder and plucked string orchestra, published by Bruno Henze 1951
 Concerto for guitar and orchestra, 1953
 Concerto for violoncello and orchestra
 Concertante Suite IV (A minor) for guitar (1952), published by Bruno Henze 1952
 Mandolin Suite G major for 3 mandolins and guitar
 Passacaglia and Fugue (E minor) for guitar (1952), published by Bruno Henze 1952
 Polifonia vivida, 1957
 Prelude and Molto vivace for guitar, published by Bruno Henze 1963
 Sonata for trombone and piano
 Sonata in F major for horn and piano
 Sonatine G major for violin and guitar, published by Bruno Henze 1964
 Suite I (A major) for guitar (1937), published by Bruno Henze in 1952, recorded in 1952 by Luise Walker on the LP "Guitar-Recital" (Philips N 00640 R)
 Suite II (A major) for guitar (1949), published by Bruno Henze 1952
 Suite III (g minor) for guitar (1951), published by Bruno Henze 1952
 Suite in B minor for flute, oboe, clarinet, horn and bassoon op. 57, published in 1995
 Suite G major for three guitars, published by Bruno Henze 1954
 Suite G major for soprano, baritone and folk instrument orchestra, published by Bruno Henze 1951
 Our Father for mixed choir, 1947

Music for radio plays 
 Der Schicksalsweg der Grete Minde by Peter Huchel, director: Hans-Peter Schmiedel, Reichssender Leipzig, 22 June 1939

Literature 
 Franz Hirtler: Ambrosius, Hermann, in Die Musik in Geschichte und Gegenwart vol. 15 1973, 
 Reinhard Froese: Archiv Hermann Ambrosius. Joachim Trekel Musikverlag. Hamburg 1997 – Bundesakademie für musikalische Jugendbildung

References

External links 
 
 Hermann Ambrosius bei Klassika
 

20th-century classical composers
German composers
Nazi Party members
1897 births
1983 deaths
Musicians from Hamburg